George Gilliam Steele Sr. (April 1, 1798 – October 21, 1855) was an American architect in Huntsville, Alabama.

Early life and family
Steele was born April 1, 1798 in Bedford County, Virginia. Around 1818, he moved from his home in Virginia to Huntsville, Alabama. In December 1823 he married Eliza Ann Weaver (1808-1891) and they had eight children. One of his sons, Matthew W. Steele became an architect as well. It is not clear whether George or Matthew designed Quietdale. Another son, Col. Jno. Steele was a civil engineer.

Architectural career
Steele began his architectural career as a builder and constructed his own house in 1824. Initially self taught, he attended architecture lectures in New York. Steele acquired a reputation as a talented architect.

Much of the labor involved in building Steele's designs was done by slaves. Steele owned 74 slaves at the time of his death, many of whom were trained in construction. He would rent more slaves if a job required it. If slaves could not be found, he contracted work out to white tradesmen. 

Over the course of his career, he designed several major buildings in the city. Several were demolished in the 1960s as city leaders sought to modernize and accommodate aerospace industry.

Steele died on October 21, 1855. He was buried in Maple Hill Cemetery.

Selected works
Former Madison County Courthouse, demolished ca. 1965
First National Bank
Oak Place (1840)
Huntsville Female College, destroyed by fire in 1895

References

External links
George Gilliam Steele on Find a Grave

1798 births
1855 deaths
Architects from Alabama
19th-century American architects

People from Huntsville, Alabama
People from Bedford County, Virginia